The Adelaide 36ers, also known as the Sixers, are an Australian professional men's basketball team in the National Basketball League (NBL). The 36ers are the only team in the league representing the state of South Australia and are based in the state's capital of Adelaide. The club was originally called the Adelaide City Eagles when they joined the NBL in 1982, but changed their name to the 36ers the following year. The 36ers nickname comes from the fact that the Colony of South Australia was officially proclaimed on 28 December 1836. Since 2019, the 36ers play their home games at the Adelaide Entertainment Centre.

The 36ers' tally of four championships is equal with the New Zealand Breakers, and fourth only behind the Sydney Kings (five), Melbourne United (six) and Perth Wildcats (ten) as the most by any club in the NBL's history.

History

1980s: The Golden Era 
After the demise of the Forestville Eagles at the end of the 1981 NBL season had left the West Adelaide Bearcats as Adelaide's only representative in the NBL, the Basketball Association of South Australia formed a composite team representing all the state league teams (not the Bearcats). This team was known as the Adelaide City Eagles when they joined the NBL in 1982. Mike Osborne was appointed as team coach, Chris Stirling was captain and the team, like West Adelaide, played out of the 3,000 seat Apollo Stadium. The Eagles performed well in their first season but missed the playoffs finishing in 7th place on the ladder with a 15–11 record. The championship was won that year by the West Adelaide Bearcats who featured future 36ers in 1982 NBL MVP Al Green, Moscow Olympian Peter Ali and veteran guard Ray Wood.

The Adelaide City Eagles changed their name after the 1982 season to the Adelaide 36ers to reflect on the history of South Australia's proclamation in 1836. Mike Osborne continued as head coach while David Winslow was named team captain. The 36ers once again missed the NBL playoffs in 1983 finishing 6th on the ladder with an 11–11 record.

The 1984 NBL season saw the first time the 36ers would reach the NBL finals, finishing the regular season in 3rd place in the Western Division with a 16–7 record. The team lost their Elimination Final to the Nunawading Spectres 108–101. Following the season, Mike Osborne was not retained as coach. With the West Adelaide Bearcats facing financial difficulties, the club pulled out of the NBL after 1984 with a number of their players joining the 36ers. From 1985 the Adelaide 36ers would be the sole South Australian team in the NBL, a situation that continues as of the 2016–17 NBL season.

Former Australian Boomer and 1964 Olympic representative Ken Cole was signed as coach of the Adelaide 36ers for the 1985 NBL season. Under Cole (who had previously coached in South Australia in the 1970s), the 36ers became one of the league's premier teams. Import players including 6'9" (207 cm) centre Bill Jones, New York-born combo guard Al Green (who had been drafted by the San Diego Chargers as a Defensive back in the 1979 NFL Draft despite not playing football) and an NBL rookie in 24-year-old Power forward from Philadelphia, Mark Davis who joined the team 5 games into the season after dominating the local league with South Adelaide, combined with local players Darryl Pearce, team captain Peter Ali, young gun Mike McKay, and veteran Ray Wood to help Adelaide to a 20–6 record and second on the regular season ladder behind the Brian Kerle coached Brisbane Bullets who featured Australian Olympian Larry Sengstock, arguably the league's best player and former West Adelaide championship player Leroy Loggins, Ronnie "The Rat" Radliff, and the "Black Pearl" Cal Bruton. The team had a bye going into the semi-final where they easily defeated for the Newcastle Falcons 151–103 at home in what the then record semi-final win in the NBL, something Ken Cole had publicly predicted would happen. Leading 105–84 going into the last period, Cole told his team that he wanted a record score for a Semi-final and the team responded, producing a 46–19 last period to blow the Falcons away and get the record. In the last single game NBL grand final ever played, Adelaide were up against the Brisbane Bullets on the Bullets' home court (Sleeman Sports Centre). Going into the final period the game the Bullets' were leading 78–74 but a 42–21 last period in favour of the home team with Loggins leading the way saw Adelaide fail to win their first grand final going down 95–120.

1985 would see Al Green set a single season points per game record for the 36ers when he scored 31.0 ppg in 28 games played (the record still stands as of 2016–17). Green, who Ken Cole chose to move to Point guard and leave Darryl Pearce at off guard, adjusted to his new role running the team's offense and also led the team in assists for the first time averaging 5.1 per game. His form saw him selected to his second All-NBL First Team after also winning selection in 1981 while with West Adelaide (amazingly, despite being the 1982 league MVP he had been overlooked for a place in the All NBL First Team that year). For his efforts during the season, 19-year-old guard Mike McKay was awarded the NBL's Rookie of the Year award (despite having already played 38 games with West Adelaide in 1983 and 1984 as a bench player). McKay played all 28 games, averaging 12.9 points, 3.4 rebounds and 1.3 assists per game.

1986 would see the Adelaide 36ers win the first of their four NBL championships. 27-year-old import centre Bill Jones replaced Peter Ali as captain and 6'6" (199 cm) former import forward (now a naturalised Australian citizen) Dwayne Nelson returned to the team after a year away, while Ken Cole would win the NBL Coach of the Year award after guiding the team to a 24–2 record, 5 more wins than the second placed Canberra Cannons (as of 2016–17 this is the only time a 36ers coach has won the award). The 36ers were undefeated at home during the regular season going 13–0, the first time a club had gone unbeaten at home in league history. The two games the 36ers lost in the regular season were both last second shots against the West Sydney Westars and Coburg Giants respectively. Those two losses ultimately denied Adelaide a perfect season but earned the team the nickname "The Invincibles" (the nickname was given by Adelaide's multi-award-winning basketball journalist Boti Nagy). Again earning a bye into the semi-finals, Adelaide this time accounted for the Illawarra Hawks 116–92 before moving onto their second grand final in a row, this time to be played over three games instead of the single game that had been in place previously. Once again facing the Brisbane Bullets, the 36ers won the first game of the series 122–119 in overtime in front of a then NBL record crowd of over 11,000 at the Brisbane Entertainment Centre. Back home in Adelaide the 36ers would lose only their third game of the year (and first at home, ending a 20-game home winning streak dating back to June 1985) when they lost Game 2 83–104 at Apollo. The final game played at home in front of a packed Apollo Stadium saw the Adelaide 36ers win their first championship with a 113–91 victory. Mark Davis finished second in the NBL in total rebounds (15.8 per game), won the NBL Grand Final MVP award and also won selection in the All NBL First Team. The 36ers average winning margin in 1986 was 17.8 points and 25 years later during the 2011–12 NBL season, the 1986 36ers were named the league's greatest ever team on the NBL's official website.

Despite the on court success there was controversy at the club during the 1986 season with coach Ken Cole suspended towards the end of the regular season by the club board over his smoking of marijuana joint during a road trip to Brisbane, a situation that Cole was open about and never denied. Indeed, in a television interview he stated that he was recommended it by his family doctor as a way of dealing with health problems (diabetes) and physical pain. After the story was broken in one of Adelaide's daily newspaper's at the time, The Advertiser, Cole was suspended by the club for the last two games and the team was coached by his assistant Don Shipway. Before the playoffs, the players got together and went to the club board demanding Cole's return, going so far as to tell the board that they would refuse to play unless Cole was coaching them. Under immense pressure from not only the players but the general public of Adelaide who supported Cole despite his admitted use of the drug, the club board relented and Cole returned for the 1986 playoffs, though it was known that he would be sacked over the incident at the end of the season regardless of a championship win or not.

Ken Cole, the 1986 NBL Coach of the Year and the 1986 championship winning coach was replaced for the 1987 NBL season by former Nunawading Sectres import guard Gary Fox, who would continue the work started by Cole by coaching Adelaide to their second minor premiership in a row with a 21–5 record, though their coaching styles were vastly different. While Cole was a coach who was high on motivating his players, Fox ran a much more stringent operation and the free-flowing 36ers of 1985 and 1986 became far more structured, much to the dismay of Al Green and Mike McKay who preferred a more free flowing offence. However, despite the change, for the third season running the team had earned a bye to the semi-finals where this time they would face the Perth Wildcats who were in their first ever playoffs. In a major upset the defending NBL champions lost the series 2–1 to the Wildcats. They won 99–98 in Perth but then lost games two and three 99–101 and 93–103 at Apollo. Perth had emerged from the doldrums of previous years and were the emerging power team in the NBL. The Wildcats and new coach Cal Bruton, who had left Brisbane after a public falling out with Bullets coach Brian Kerle following the 1986 season, built a team with the aim of beating the champion 36ers. Bruton recruited James Crawford to counter Mark Davis, former Harlem Globetrotter Kendall "Tiny" Pinder to counter Bill Jones, they had team captain Mike Ellis to counter Darryl Pearce and Bruton himself to oppose his best friend off the court, Al Green. The ploy worked with the Wildcats defeating the 36ers in what was considered an upset, though the Wildcats would be swept in the Grand Final by the Bullets.

After winning the Grand Final MVP award in 1986, Mark Davis would continue to have a major impact on the NBL when he jointly won the league's MVP award with Brisbane's Leroy Loggins. Davis also led the league in rebounding for the third straight season, averaging 17.8 for the year.

Adelaide finished with their third minor premiership in a row and the second under Gary Fox after finishing with a 19–5 record in 1988 but would again be beaten Semi-finalists. Bill Jones was replaced as team captain by Fox who appointed Australian Boomers representative Darryl Pearce as the new captain. Against the Ken Cole coached Falcons in Newcastle in Round 2, Darryl Pearce would set a still standing single game scoring record for the 36ers when he scored 48 points including 11 of 14 three-point attempts. 1988 also saw 6'10" (208 cm), Adelaide born centre and Australian Institute of Sport (AIS) attendee Mark Bradtke make his NBL debut for the 36ers. Bradtke had been signed by Ken Cole in 1986 as a 6'8" (203 cm) 16 year with more growing to come. Bradtke however, living in Brisbane at the time, committed to the AIS for two years before joining Adelaide. Playing mostly as a backup centre to the more experienced Bill Jones (and often playing as backup Power forward to Mark Davis), Bradtke played in 23 games, averaging 7.4 points and 5.4 rebounds and 1.4 blocks per game.

Both Darryl Pearce and Mark Bradtke won selection for Australia at the 1988 Summer Olympic Games in Seoul, helping the team to finish 4th after being defeated 49–78 in the bronze medal playoff game by a United States team that included future NBA Hall of Fame players David Robinson and Mitch Richmond as well as NBA players Dan Majerle, Danny Manning and Hersey Hawkins. Bradtke's selection at age 18 making him the youngest player at the time to ever represent Australia in Basketball at the Summer Olympics (Bradtke turned 19 during the games).

1989 was to be Gary Fox's last season with the Adelaide 36ers and it saw the team drop to 6th on the regular season ladder with a 15–9 record. Bill Jones left the team to join former coach Ken Cole in Newcastle and was replaced as an import player by 1983 NCAA West Coast Conference Men's Basketball Player of the Year and former Los Angeles Lakers draft pick, 6'7" (201 cm) Orlando Phillips. The team had a down year by its recent standards and Adelaide was eliminated in the Elimination Final by their playoff nemesis, the Perth Wildcats. With Jones now gone from the team, Mark Bradtke became the starting centre for the 36ers and his star continued to rise with the Olympic representative winning the NBL's Most Improved Player award. Bradtke averaged 15.0 points, 7.6 rebounds and 1.3 blocks per game over the 24-game season.

1990s 
36ers long time assistant coach Don Shipway was appointed coach of the team for the 1990 NBL season which saw the team miss the playoffs for the first time since 1983 when they finished 9th with an 11–15 record, the club's first ever losing season. Mark Davis replaced Darryl Pearce captain of the team in 1990, a position he would hold until the end of the 1996 season. 1990 also saw the final year for former captain and local favourite Peter Ali who retired from playing at the end of the season after 279 games, 141 of them with the 36ers since 1985.

Shipway was retained as coach for the 1991 NBL season despite the team's worst ever performance in 1990. With the recruitment of import point guard Butch Hays to replace Al Green who had been pushed out and would join Newcastle, as well as a skinny 6'10" (208 cm), 19 year old, Noarlunga Tigers player Brett Wheeler joining the team to give extra size that the team lacked outside Bradtke, the team turned their form around finishing the regular season in 4th place with a 16–10 record. They lost their semi-final series to their nemesis, defending and eventual league champion the Perth Wildcats, missing out on their third grand final appearance in 5 years. 1991 was the last season that local favourite and former captain Darryl Pearce would play for the club, signing with the North Melbourne Giants from 1992. The season was also the team's last playing out of the 3,000 seat Apollo Stadium which had opened in 1969 as a new venue was due to be opened for the 1992 season.

Adelaide had played at the Apollo Stadium since the team's inception in 1982. However ticket demand was more than double that of what Apollo could hold (often tickets for games would be sold out in less than an hour), so in conjunction with the Basketball Association of South Australia (BASA), a new home for basketball in South Australia was opened in 1992 in the western suburb of Findon. Built on the site of a former rubbish dump, he AU$16m, 8,000 seat Clipsal Powerhouse quickly became a fortress for the 36ers with every game played in front of a sell-out crowd (at an open day for the new arena staged a week before the opening round, the 36ers sold over 6,000 season tickets for the 1992 season). However their road form wasn't so good and they dropped to 9th on the table with an 11–13 record. Mark Bradtke and Mike McKay would go on to represent Australia at the 1992 Summer Olympic Games in Barcelona. 1992 was also the rookie NBL season for Brett Maher who would go on to play a record 525 games for the club and captain the team to three NBL championships.

After their second losing season, the 36ers replaced Don Shipway as coach with American Don Monson for the 1993 season. The team had lost centre Mark Bradtke to the Melbourne Tigers in acrimonious circumstances during the off-season, but gained experience in NBL championship winners, Adelaide born Aussie Boomers captain Phil Smyth and veteran 6'11" (211 cm) centre Willie Simmons, both from the Canberra Cannons. Adelaide improved to a 14–12 record under Monson and made the playoffs finishing in 7th place but were beaten in the quarter-finals by the defending NBL champion South East Melbourne Magic. Whyalla junior and AIS attendee, barrel chested 6'5" (195 cm) forward Chris Blakemore was named the 1993 NBL Rookie of the Year, while 8th year guard (and future team coach) Scott Ninnis was voted as the NBL's Most Improved Player, scoring a career best 20.1 points and 4.4 assists per game after returning from two seasons in Melbourne with the Eastside Spectres and the Magic respectively. Ninnis, who made his NBL debut in 1985, had been part of the 1986 championship squad.

The Adelaide 36ers pulled off a major signing between the 1993 and 1994 seasons when they enticed the league's 1993 MVP Robert Rose away from the Magic. The undersized 36ers also acquired 6'8" (203 cm) forward Andrew Svaldenis from the Hobart Devils. They also had a new head coach in former NCAA coach Mike Dunlap. Finishing in 4th place with a 19–8 record, the 36ers won their semi-final series against the defending champion Melbourne Tigers to win their way into the 1994 NBL Grand Final series against the North Melbourne Giants. The win over the Tigers came at a cost though as team captain Mark Davis's court time was limited in the Grand Final after dislocating his right shoulder during the first game of the semi-finals. Adelaide went down to the Giants 0–2, losing game one at the Powerhouse 93–95 in overtime and game two at The Glass House in Melbourne 117–97. Robert Rose averaged 32 points for the 36ers over the two grand final games, scoring 33 in game one and 31 in game two. He played a major role in game one as Adelaide came back from 63 to 77 down in the last period down to level the game at 84–84 at the end of regulation time and most felt that had Adelaide won the series he would have been the leading candidate for the Grand Final MVP award. The award was deservedly won by Giants centre and future three time 36ers championship player Paul Rees.

Despite the departure of Phil Smyth to the Sydney Kings, Adelaide's good form continued into 1995 with the team reaching the semi-finals where they were eliminated by their playoff nemesis Perth who had also eliminated them in the 1987 and 1991 semi-finals, and the 1989 elimination final. After the 1995 season and twice winning the club's MVP award in his two seasons in Adelaide, Robert Rose was let go by the club who claimed that his asking price was too high. Privately the talk was that at 31 years of age, the club felt his best years were behind him. However, rumours had been circulating around Adelaide that former NCAA college coach Dunlap preferred to coach younger players who still could be taught and didn't get along very well with the team's older players, which led to the departures of Mike McKay (Brisbane), Phil Smyth (Sydney) and Robert Rose (Canberra). Dunlap had also been in hot water over an incident in the 1995 Semi-finals against Perth. During a time out of Game 1 at the Powerhouse, Dunlap had instructed Chris Blakemore to basically belt the next Perth player who went through the key. Minutes later, Blackmore backhanded Martin Cattalini as he cut through the key, giving him a cut on his mouth that required 15 stitches, an incident which almost led to a brawl (Cattalini later told that not retaliating was self-preservation as Blakemore, who looked more like a professional wrestler than a basketball player, had gained a reputation of one player not to mess with). Although Blakemore was suspended for Game 2 of the series in Perth, the club had not been happy with Dunlap's handling of the situation.

The team had recruited well going into the 1996 NBL season, obtaining forwards Martin Cattalini from the championship winning Perth Wildcats, and serial slam dunking forward Leon Trimmingham from the Sydney Kings, as well as 2nd year guard John Rillie from the Brisbane Bullets, while Chris Blakemore was released to join Canberra. Despite continued good form which saw the 36ers again make the playoffs under Dunlap in 1996, the 36ers were again eliminated in the semi-finals. Following the sudden death of his father after the 1996 season, coach Dunlap return home to the United States and decided to stay there to be closer to his family. However, it was not as simple as it looked. Since joining the 36ers, Dunlap had been systematically removing the older players from the squad, but when he wanted to release captain and club legend Mark Davis, the club board stood by Davis and after his father's passing it was mutually agreed that Dunlap would not return as coach.

During the 1996 season, 36ers guard Brett Maher was selected to play for the Australian Boomers at the 1996 Olympic Games in Atlanta. Maher, Mark Davis (who had become an Australian citizen in 1992), Brett Wheeler and Chris Blakemore had all made their debut for the Boomers in March 1995 at the Clipsal Powerhouse in the first of a 5-game series with the touring Magic Johnson All-Stars.

The club hired Dunlap's assistant and former Gold Coast Rollers coach Dave Claxton as his replacement for the 1997 NBL season. This season also saw Brett Maher take over the team captaincy from Mark Davis, something he would hold until his retirement in 2009, a record total of 381 games. Adelaide finished with a 14–16 record in 1997, finishing in 7th place and missing the playoffs for the first time since 1992.

1998–2008: Phil Smyth Era 
Claxton, who was only signed by the club at the last moment due to unexpectedly losing Mike Dunlap, was only signed for one season as head coach and following the 1997 season was replaced by rookie coach and former player Phil Smyth (it was incorrectly believed that Claxton had been sacked). Smyth was hired despite his only previous coaching experience being as a specialist coach at the Australian Institute of Sport during his playing days in Canberra. The club was banking on his years of NBL and international experience to translate into coaching. The gamble worked and the 36ers turned their fortunes around under Smyth and finished the regular season in 2nd place with a 19–11 record. The club head recruited 6'9" (205 cm) centre Paul Rees from North Melbourne as well as former Denver Nuggets guard, 6'5" (196 cm) Darnell Mee (who joined the team from the Canberra Cannons) and his former Nuggets teammate, 6'6" (198 cm) forward Kevin Brooks. They won through to the 1998 NBL Grand Final series by finally disposing their Finals nemesis the Perth Wildcats in just 2 games. In the Grand Final they would be up against the South East Melbourne Magic where they would win the club's first championship since 1986 defeating the Magic 2–0, winning Game 1 100–93 at home and Game 2 90–62 at Melbourne Park. Kevin Brooks was named the Grand Final MVP in what was the last ever winter season for the National Basketball League. The 36ers had not been expected to defeat the Brian Goorjian coached Magic who had a 26-4 regular season record and had easily swept the Brisbane Bullets in the Semi-finals. Amazingly, Game 1 of the Grand Final was only the second time the 36ers had defeated the Magic since the Eastside Melbourne Spectres and Southern Melbourne Saints had merged to form the Magic in 1992. The 36ers only other win against the Magic had been in 1997 at the Powerhouse.

Following the 1998 season, the NBL moved from being a winter league to playing during Australia's summer, meaning that seasons would start in October and finish in March rather than go from April to November (in preparation for the change, the 1998 season had started in January and ran to July rather than the usual April to October/November). The change in time slot didn't stop the defending NBL champion 36ers though as they finished the 1998–99 regular season with their first minor premiership since 1988 with an 18–8 record. Again winning their way into the Grand Final series, they became three time NBL champions and the first team to win back to back titles since Perth in 1990 and 1991 by defeating the Victoria Titans two games to one. Captain Brett Maher was voted the Grand Final MVP and coach Phil Smyth had his second championship in two years of coaching.

At the conclusion of the 1999 NBL championship season, the 36ers were invited to take part in the McDonald's Championship, held at the 12,000 seat Fila Forum in Milan, Italy. The 36ers finished 5th out of 6 in the tournament with a 1–1 record. After losing their first game 90–79 to Brazilian side CR Vasco da Gama, the team won the 5–6 place playoff 91–84 over Lebanese team Hekmeh BC. The 1999 McDonald's Championship was won by NBA champions the San Antonio Spurs who defeated Vasco da Gama 103–68 in the final. To date this was the last McDonald's Championship held.

The 36ers form would continue in both the 1999–2000 and 2000–01 seasons, despite losing star import forward Kevin Brooks to the Sydney Kings for the 1999–00 season after the NBL ruled that the 36ers could not keep him and remain under the salary cap, though he would return in 2000–01. They were again minor premiers in 1999–2000 with a 22–6 record but missed out on becoming the first team to win three NBL championships in a row when they lost in the Semi-finals to the Titans. Following the 1999–00 season, Brett Maher and Martin Cattalini were selected to represent the Australian Boomers at the 2000 Olympics in Sydney.

After falling to 6th on the ladder at the end of 2000–01 and just scraping into the playoffs, the 36ers would again only advance as far as the Semi-finals before losing to the eventual champions, the Wollongong Hawks. Import Darnell Mee, in his fourth year with the club would win his third consecutive NBL Best Defensive Player award but would be lost to the club at the end of the season due to salary cap restraints.

The 2000–01 season was also the last for longtime Adelaide favourite and former club captain Mark Davis who retired from playing after 482 NBL games, all with the Adelaide 36ers. At the time of his retirement, Mark Davis was the NBL's all-time leading rebounder having grabbed 5,200 in his career, averaging 10.7 per game. He was also the 36ers all-time leading scorer with 8,752 points (18.2 pg) and the team's leading shot blocker with 301 (0.6 pg). Davis was an integral member of the 1986, 1998 and 1998–99 championship teams.

2001–02 would see the Adelaide 36ers win a then record fourth NBL title and the third for coach Phil Smyth. The team would finish the regular season in 3rd place with a 17–13 record before winning their way into their sixth NBL Grand Final. Facing the West Sydney Razorbacks, Adelaide were victorious two games to one. Adelaide's 125 points in game 3 is the highest ever score in an NBL Grand Final game while they also hit a Grand Final record 19 three-pointers in the game. Adelaide captain Brett Maher became only the second player in NBL history along with Perth's Ricky Grace to win two Grand Final MVP awards. Joining the club that year was import shooting guard Willie Farley as well as local juniors Oscar Forman and Jacob Holmes.

Under Phil Smyth, Adelaide were beaten Elimination-Finalists in both 2002–03 and 2003–04. They were beaten quarter-finalists in both the 2004–05 and 2005–06 seasons. The 2006–07 NBL season saw the 36ers miss the playoffs for the first time since Smyth took over as coach, finishing a club record worst-place of 11th with an 11–13 record. They would again miss the playoffs in 2007–08 finishing in 9th place with a 14–16 record. Following his second losing season, the team decided to replace Phil Smyth as head coach with former player and Smyth assistant Scott Ninnis.

2008–present 
Ninnis would coach the team for two seasons of a 3-season contract, leading the team to the Elimination Finals in 2008–09. The team, which included local junior and former NBA player, 7'1" (216 cm) centre Luke Schenscher, finished the regular season in 6th place with a 15–15 record before losing their quarter final 131–101 to the New Zealand Breakers in Auckland. 2009 was also the last season for the club games record holder Brett Maher who was retiring after 526 NBL games and three championships with the 36ers. The 2009–10 season was a disaster however and the Adelaide 36ers finished on the bottom of the NBL ladder for the first time in their history with a 10–18 record. Former Michigan State Spartans NCAA Final Four championship winner and now naturalised Australian, 6'9" (205 cm) forward/centre Adam Ballinger, in his third season with the club became team captain in 2009–10 following the retirement of Maher.

Long serving club captain Brett Maher, who made his 36ers debut on the night they opened the Clipsal Powerhouse, retired from the NBL having played in 525 games for the club, captaining the club to 3 NBL championships (1998, 1998/99, 2001/02), and twice winning the NBL's Grand Final MVP award in 1998/99 and 2001/02. On the occasion of his last home game against the New Zealand Breakers in front of an overflow crowd of more than 8,000 fans, the main court at The Dome was renamed the Brett Maher Court. Maher also played over 100 games for the Australian Boomers and had the honour of captaining the Boomers at the 2001 Goodwill Games held in Brisbane, becoming the first 36ers player to captain his country.

Following the club's worst ever season, Scott Ninnis was sacked as coach and replaced by former AIS coach Marty Clarke for the 2010–11 NBL season. Clarke, a former guard who had won the NBL Grand Final with the North Melbourne Giants in 1989, had experience coaching at the AIS, though he had never before coached an NBL team nor had he any experience coaching a senior team in any competition.

Adelaide and Clarke endured a difficult season in 2010–11. They lost guard Nathan Herbert before the season with an Anterior cruciate ligament injury. Further injuries to import guards Troy DeVries and Craig Winder ultimately saw them replaced in the squad. For the first time in their history, the Adelaide 36ers failed to win at least 10 games in a season, finishing with a 9–19 record. They did avoid their second straight last place finish only because the returning Sydney Kings finished with an 8–20 record. Captain Adam Ballinger was again the club's leading player as he won his fourth straight club MVP award, finished third in the NBL's MVP voting and was selected to the NBL's All Third team.

Things didn't get any better for the 36ers or Clarke in the 2011–12 and 2012–13 seasons. The club finished with the wooden spoon in both seasons and ended each with an 8–20 record, including a club record losing streak of 8 straight games during each season. The club was also plagued by a string of failed imports, though most were lost through injury, others either under-performed or were misused by the coaching staff, with one of the only shining lights being power forward Diamon Simpson who posted 12 double-doubles in 27 games. At the end of the 2012–13 NBL season coach Clarke and his assistant coach Mark Radford were let go by the club. There were bright spots though. The emergence of 6'11" (212 cm) centre Daniel Johnson as a scoring and rebounding threat (he led the club in scoring for both seasons and led the NBL with 8 rebounds per game in 2012–13), the signing of former Gold Coast Blaze players Adam Gibson, Anthony Petrie and Jason Cadee, and the emergence of exciting young Victorian Swingman and crowd favourite Mitch Creek (who suffered a season ending Achilles tendon injury in mid-2012–13), gave fans hope for the future.

For the 2013–14 NBL season, the Adelaide 36ers signed the 2007 NBL championship winning coach Joey Wright as their new head coach and added former 36ers championship player Kevin Brooks as his assistant. In desperate need of on-court direction, the club also signed the 2011 NBL MVP, point guard Gary Ervin. After Round 7 of the season the 36ers, led by Ervin and Johnson, were sitting in 2nd place on the NBL ladder with a 7–2 record which included a 5–0 run. This also saw the team sweep both of their games against the Breakers in Auckland, their first wins over the triple defending champions since 2009. During Rd.7 the 36ers underlined their championship credentials when they defeated the previously undefeated Perth Wildcats 91–86 in front of 6,585 fans at the Adelaide Arena, the largest 36ers home crowd since Brett Maher's last home game in 2009.

The 36ers run in 2013–14 which saw them finish the regular season in second place with an 18–10 record. They then defeated the Melbourne Tigers 2–1 in their Semi-final series before going down 2–1 in the Grand Final series to their long time nemesis Perth who won their record 6th NBL championship. Daniel Johnson won his third straight club MVP award and was also named to the All NBL First Team. Game 2 of the Grand Final series also saw the club's record home attendance of 8,127 at the Adelaide Arena with the 36ers keeping the series alive with an 89–84 win.

The 2015–16 season saw the 36ers sign import point guard Jerome Randle to replace Kenyon McNeail, who sustained an injury and left after three games, while the team also acquired young guard Nathan Sobey from the Cairns Taipans. Randle led the league in scoring and earned the inaugural NBL Australia Post Fan's MVP. Despite Randle's great individual season, the 36ers failed to make the playoffs with a 14–14 record.

In the 2016 NBL off-season, the 36ers managed to retain superstar Jerome Randle as well as signing promising young prospects Anthony Drmic, the younger brother of former NBL player Frank Drmic, Sudanese born local Majok Deng and import forward/centre Eric Jacobsen. Also joining the club was NBA Draft prospect, 18-year-old high school star from Tulsa, Oklahoma named Terrance Ferguson, a 6'7" (201 cm) shooting guard who joined Adelaide rather than commit to playing college basketball.

While most experts predicted the young and relatively inexperienced 36ers to finish last, the 2016–17 NBL season saw the 36ers emerge as the team to beat. After a slow start which saw the team with a 3–6 record by Round 7 where they took a 105–87 mauling at home by the Brisbane Bullets (who returned to the NBL for the first time since 2008), plus early season injuries to captain Mitch Creek (ankle) and Daniel Johnson (hamstring), the 36ers turned their season around from Round 8 with a 101–83 away win over Brisbane, highlighted by a monster Terrance Ferguson dunk. With Creek and Johnson back on deck as well as the MVP form of Randle and Nathan Sobey looking a strong candidate for the NBL's Most Improved Player award, the team went on a charge, winning 14 of their next 15 games and by the end of Round 16 of the 19 round season had been confirmed as minor premiers for the first time since the 1999–2000, being an incredible 5 games ahead of the chasing pack. Despite being so far in front, Adelaide lost their final four games of the regular season and still finished two games ahead of the top. Their loss of momentum proved costly in the NBL Final Series, with the 36ers bundled out in a three-game series against the Illawarra Hawks.

With the 36ers' list proving it had what it takes to contend the championship, Joey Wright locked in all eight Australians players (Mitch Creek, Nathan Sobey, Daniel Johnson, Matthew Hodgson, Brendan Teys, Majok Deng, Anthony Drmic and Adam Doyle) from the 2016–17 roster for the 2017–18 season. One notable absence from the roster was star US import, Jerome Randle, who was replaced by experienced guard, Shannon Shorter. Philadelphian shooting guard, Ramone Moore, and athletic forward Ronald Roberts took the other two import spots to complete the list. In mid-September 2017, the 36ers travelled to Singapore in the pre-season to compete in the Merlion Cup. The team remained undefeated throughout the tournament and defeated the Shanghai Sharks in the final to be crowned the 2017 Merlion Cup Champions.

The Sixers impressed on the road early, but struggled to string consistent performances together, winning half of their first 16 games. A disappointing 19-point loss against the Cairns Taipans at home on Christmas Eve was the turning point for the Sixers, who went on to win 10 of their last 12 games, including seven-in-a-row, and booking themselves second spot on the ladder at the end of the regular season.

The 36ers defeated the Perth Wildcats in a straight sweep of the Semi-Final Series, to secure their spot in the Grand Final Series against Melbourne United. The series was a hard-fought battle, with both teams winning on their home court to level the series at one-all. In the deciding game in Melbourne, United were too strong for the Sixers defeating them to take the 2017–18 championship, 100-82.

The Adelaide 36ers have reached the playoffs 24 times in 34 full seasons, and on top of their four championships in 1986, 1998, 1998–99 and 2001–02, they reached the Grand Final in 1985, 1994, 2013–14 and 2017–18. They have also finished as minor premier on six occasions (1986, 1987, 1988, 1998–99, 1999–2000, 2016–17), and reached the NBL semi-finals in 1987, 1988, 1991, 1995, 1996, 1999–2000, 2000–01, 2014–15, 2016–17 and 2017–18.

Sponsorship 
The Adelaide 36ers were previously sponsored by Pura Milk and with the naming rights of Pura Milk 36ers. Before this they were the West End 36ers (as in West End Brewery) during their first title year (1986) while also taking various names from West End products including being known for a time during the 1990s as the Eagle Super 6ers. In 2009 the team was sponsored by Hood Sweeney, an Adelaide-based consulting firm and were known as the Hood Sweeney Adelaide 36ers. Other major sponsors include Kia Motors and Sprint Auto Parts. In 2017–18 the Adelaide 36ers' major partners were Pathion, Scouts, Ananda, Goodlife and Villi's.

Coaches 
The first head coach of the Adelaide City Eagles in 1982 was Mike Osborne, who would coach the team (renamed the Adelaide 36ers in 1983) until the end of the 1984 season.

As of the 2016–17 NBL season, the Adelaide 36ers have had eleven head coaches, including Ken Cole who coached the team to two NBL Grand Finals in his two seasons with the club (1985 and 1986) and led the team to their first ever championship in 1986, the first time the NBL Grand Final was a best of 3 series instead of a single championship game. Cole is also the only 36ers coach to be named as the NBL's Coach of the Year having won the award in 1986.

Former St Kilda import guard Gary Fox took over as coach in 1987 after Cole's sensational sacking from the club and led the team to the 1987 and 1988 minor premiership, but the team was defeated in the Semi-finals each season by the Perth Wildcats and Canberra Cannons respectively. Fox's last season with Adelaide was 1989 where the team finished as beaten Elimination finalists.

Fox was replaced by the club's long-time assistant coach Don Shipway who coached the team from 1990 to 1992. Unfortunately, Shipway will more be remembered for slapping a fan during a time-out of an away game against the Hobart Devils in 1992. The NBL suspended Shipway for 4 games (later reduced to 2 on appeal). Shipway was replaced for the 1993 season by veteran American coach Don Monson.

American Mike Dunlap who led the team to the 1994 NBL Grand Final series against the North Melbourne Giants, and the 1995 NBL Semi-finals, went on to become head coach of the Charlotte Bobcats of the NBA for one season in 2012–13, becoming the first person to be a head coach in both the NBL and the NBA.

The 36ers longest serving coach was Adelaide born Australian basketball legend Phil Smyth. "The General" coached the team for 11 seasons from 1998 to 2007–08, leading the club to the 1998, 1998–99 and 2001–02 NBL championships. In 1998 Smyth became the first rookie coach since Brian Kerle in the league's inaugural season (1979) to win an NBL championship, thought unlike Kerle, Smyth had limited previous senior coaching experience. He had coached the South Adelaide Panthers senior women's team in the early 1980s and later was a part-time specialist coach at the Canberra based Australian Institute of Sport (AIS) during his playing days with the Canberra Cannons from 1983 to 1992.

As of 2016–17, the Adelaide 36ers are coached by the 2006–07 NBL championship (Brisbane Bullets) winning coach Joey Wright, with former dual 36ers championship player Kevin Brooks as the assistant coach.

List of 36ers coaches 
 Mike Osborne: 1982–1984
 Ken Cole: 1985–1986
 Gary Fox: 1987–1989
 Don Shipway: 1990–1992
 Don Monson: 1993
 Mike Dunlap: 1994–1996
 Dave Claxton: 1997
 Phil Smyth: 1998–2008
 Scott Ninnis: 2008–2010
 Marty Clarke: 2010–2013
 Joey Wright: 2013–2020
 Conner Henry: 2020–2021

Ownership 
In April 2006 the 36ers, the Adelaide Lightning WNBL team and the team's home venue, the Distinctive Homes Dome (now the Adelaide Arena), went up for sale due to mishandling of debt owed to the government by the then owner BASA. On 25 July 2006, a consortium of NBL chairman Mal Hemmerling, and Eddy Groves of ABC Learning bought the Adelaide 36ers and the Distinctive Homes Dome for $3.95 million – with Hemmerling in place as owner of the 36ers and Groves as the owner of the stadium. The money for the sale went to the government to wipe out the debt owed by BASA. BASA is now defunct and replaced by Basketball SA – focused solely on all Basketball in SA and no one competition.

In June 2009, Hemmerling sold the team to a group of eight individuals led by new club chairman Mark Lewis and new club CEO Ben Fitzsimons called the Save Our Sixers Consortium.

In June 2015, a new group acquired the Adelaide 36ers' licence from the NBL which included management of Titanium Security Arena, the former Adelaide Arena.

In December 2016, Adelaide businessman, Grant Kelley, joined the Adelaide 36ers as majority shareholder, before becoming outright owner of the club in March 2017.

Home arena 

Between 1982 and 1991, the home court of the Eagles/36ers was the old 3,000 seated Apollo Stadium which had been built in 1969. From 1985 onward, home games were usually in front of sell-out crowds, but going into the 1990s demand for 36ers tickets was greater than what Apollo Stadium could hold. Additionally, the NBL as a whole was also experiencing a boom with the Brisbane Bullets, Perth Wildcats, and Sydney Kings all enjoying record attendances in their respective cities' new entertainment centre's, the smallest of those being Perth which held almost three times what Apollo could. During their time at Apollo, the Adelaide 36ers reached the 1985 Grand Final (played in Brisbane) and hosted two games of the successful 1986 Grand Final series win over Brisbane. The 36ers final game at their original home was a 102–99 semi-final loss to the Perth Wildcats in 1991.

By the end of the 1991 NBL season, Adelaide was one of only 5 teams in the league (there were 14) who did not have a home venue that could hold at least 5,000 fans, and it was the only state capital based team (other than the unrepresented Darwin) not to have a home venue that could hold at least 5,200 fans.

The 36ers and the BASA built a new home arena in the western suburb of Findon, which opened in 1992. Initially it was thought that the 36ers would move into the 10,500 seat, South Australian Government owned Adelaide Entertainment Centre, which opened in 1991. The Entertainment Centre had been built as the replacement for Apollo Stadium as Adelaide's major indoor concert venue as Apollo was continually being overlooked by international music acts due to its smaller size. However, rather than just be a tenant where they would pay a fee to use the facility and be subject to possible date changes due to pre-booked events, both the Adelaide 36ers and BASA wished for their own venue of operations and play that would serve as the home of basketball in South Australia.

The then-named Clipsal Powerhouse, which has an official capacity of 8,000, was and still is the largest purpose-built basketball stadium in all of Australia. Clipsal would sponsor the venue until the end of the 2001–02 season, after which it became known as the Distinctive Homes Dome in recognition of the sponsorship from Distinctive Homes.

The Dome had been without a naming rights sponsor since mid-2009. However, on 7 February of that same year, before a crowd of 7,800 fans, the main court was named the Brett Maher Court. This was due in honour of retiring long time club captain Brett Maher who had made his 36ers and NBL debut on the night the Powerhouse opened in 1992. He had played all 526 career NBL games for the club on that same court. That day, the 36ers, led by Maher, who scored 17 points in his last ever home game, defeated the New Zealand Breakers by a final score of 102–91. The venue is now (as of 2015) officially known as the Titanium Security Arena due to sponsorship from Adelaide-based company Titanium Security Australia.

During 2012 and 2013, the Adelaide Arena was in the hands of the Commonwealth Bank after former owner Eddy Groves defaulted on his loan. After much speculation that the venue would be sold and turned into a venue for other purposes, including rumours of the building being turned it into a church (effectively leaving the 36ers without a home venue and the unwanted possibility of playing at the Entertainment Centre or even the 3,000 seat Netball SA Stadium), it was announced on 3 April 2013 that SA Church Basketball and Scouts SA had become joint owners of the Adelaide Arena, ensuring it remains the home of basketball in South Australia and for both of Adelaide's national basketball teams, the 36ers and the Adelaide Lightning (Women's National Basketball League).

The renamed Titanium Security Arena is currently the sixth-largest venue used in the National Basketball League behind the 18,200 seat Qudos Bank Arena in Sydney, the 14,856 seat Perth Arena, the 14,500 capacity Brisbane Entertainment Centre, the 10,500 seat Hisense Arena in Melbourne, and the 9,300 seat Vector Arena in Auckland. It is also the only venue in the NBL that is basketball specific (though it does host other events such as netball) with all other venues either being entertainment/convention centres, tennis stadiums or general sports venues.

The 36ers highest ever home attendance was set on 11 April 2014 during Game 2 of the 2014 NBL Grand Final series against the Perth Wildcats at the Adelaide Arena. Although Perth would go on to win the 3-game series 2–1, a 36ers and South Australian basketball record 8,127 fans saw the 36ers win Game 2 89–84.

 Apollo Stadium (1982–1991)
 Titanium Security Arena (1992–2019)
 Adelaide Entertainment Centre (2019–present)

Mascot 
The Adelaide 36ers team mascot is Murray the Magpie. The magpie was chosen as the bird is found throughout Adelaide, while Murray's first name comes from the Murray River, one of South Australia's best known landmarks. Murray wears the team's No. 36 singlet.

Honour and awards

Season by season

Club and player records

Players 
 Most points in a game: 48 – Darryl Pearce vs Newcastle Falcons at the Newcastle Sports Entertainment Centre, 20 February 1988
 Most 3 pointers in a game: 11 – Darryl Pearce vs Newcastle Falcons at the Newcastle Sports Entertainment Centre, 20 February 1988, and Brett Maher vs Brisbane Bullets at the Clipsal Powerhouse, 14 September 1996
 Most assists in a game: 17 – Butch Hays vs Melbourne Tigers at the Apollo Stadium, 27 September 1991
 Most blocks in a game: 9 – Darnell Mee vs Canberra Cannons at the Clipsal Powerhouse, 25 November 2000
 Most steals in a game: 7 – Robert Rose vs Newcastle Falcons at the Clipsal Powerhouse, 22 April 1995
 Most rebounds in a game: 31 – Dan Clausen vs Canberra Cannons at the AIS Arena, 5 May 1984

Team 
 Biggest win: 75 – Adelaide def. Illawarra Hawks 156–81 at the Apollo Stadium, 20 July 1985
 Biggest loss: 48 – Brisbane Bullets def. Adelaide 155–107 at the Brisbane Convention Centre, 19 January 2008
 Biggest home loss: 39 – Melbourne United def. Adelaide 118–79 at the Adelaide Arena, 15 November 2014
 Longest winning streak: 14 – 22 June – 10 August 1985, and 26 July – 11 October 1986
 Longest losing streak: 8 – 4 February – 18 March 2011, and 30 November 2012 – 5 January 2013
 Most team points: 160 vs Hobart Devils (127) at the Apollo Stadium, 20 March 1984

All-time NBL Finals records 
 Most points scored in an NBL Grand Final game: 125 – Adelaide def. West Sydney Razorbacks 107, Game 3 at the Clipsal Powerhouse, 19 April 2002

All-time leaders 
 Games played: 525 – Brett Maher (1992–2009)
 Most points: 8,941 – Brett Maher
 Most field goals: 3,140 – Brett Maher
 Most field goals attempted: 7,072 – Brett Maher
 Most three-pointers: 1,162 – Brett Maher
 Most three's attempted: 2,835 – Brett Maher
 Most free throws: 2,037 – Mark Davis
 Most free throws attempted: 2,888 – Mark Davis
 Most rebounds: 5,200 (3,221 def; 1,979 off) – Mark Davis
 Most assists: 2,267 – Brett Maher
 Most steals: 703 – Brett Maher
 Most blocks: 301 – Mark Davis
 Most games coached: 365 – Phil Smyth (1998–2007/08)
 Most wins as coach: 205 – Phil Smyth
 Most losses as coach: 160 – Phil Smyth
 Most championships as a player: 3 – Mark Davis, Brett Maher, Paul Rees, Rupert Sapwell and Jason Williams
 Most Grand Finals as a player: 5 – Mark Davis (1985, 1986, 1994, 1998, 1998–99)
 Most championships as a coach: 3 – Phil Smyth
 Most Grand Finals as a coach: 3 – Phil Smyth
 Highest winning percentage as a coach: 82.8%  – Ken Cole (1985–1986, 58 games, 48 wins, 10 losses)

Attendances 
 Largest home attendance: 9,034 vs Melbourne United at the Adelaide Entertainment Centre, 11 January 2019, Round 15, 2019–20 NBL season.
 Largest away attendance: 13,611 vs Perth Wildcats at the Perth Arena, 14 January 2017, Round 15, 2016–17 NBL season.

Current roster

Retired numbers 

 4 Darryl Pearce (258 games – 1982–1991)
 5 Brett Maher (526 games – 1992–2009)
 15 Al Green (164 games – 1985–1990)
 33 Mark Davis (482 games – 1985–2001)

The 36ers currently have four retired numbers. They are No. 4 which belonged to shooting guard "The Iceman" Darryl Pearce who played 258 games from 1982 to 1991 and was a starter on the 1986 championship team. No. 5 which belonged to club games record holder Brett Maher who along with his 526 games also holds the club record for points scored with 8,941 and captained the club to the 1998, 1998/99 and 2001/02 NBL Championships. No.15 which was worn by American born guard Al Green who played 164 games for the club from 1985 to 1990 and was the point guard of the 1986 championship team, and the No. 33 which was worn by Mark Davis throughout his 482-game NBL/36ers career. Davis, the only 36ers player to win the league's MVP award in 1987, is the club record holder for rebounds (5,200 – 2nd all-time in the NBL) and played on the 1986, 1998 and 1998/99 championship teams. The club's MVP award is named the Mark Davis Trophy in his honour as Davis won the first awarded 9 MVP awards from 1985 to 1993.

Darryl Pearce, who holds the record for most points in a single game as a 36er when he scored 48 against the Newcastle Falcons in 1988, and the No. 15 of star import guard Al Green who played 164 games for the club between 1985 and 1990 hung high at The Dome in Adelaide but were removed by the team owners. Their numbers were officially retired by the Adelaide 36ers during the 2015–16 NBL season.

Notable players 

  Peter Ali
  B. J. Anthony
  Cameron Bairstow
  Adam Ballinger
  Everard Bartlett
  Chris Blakemore
  Mark Bradtke
  Kevin Brooks
  Aaron Bruce
  Rick Brunson
  Jason Cadee
  Rhys Carter
  Martin Cattalini
  Josh Childress
  Ian Clark
  Antonius Cleveland
 / Lanard Copeland
  Mitch Creek
  Tom Daly
 / Mark Davis
 / Sunday Dech
  Anthony Drmic
  Jo Jo English
 / Ebi Ere
  Terrance Ferguson
  Oscar Forman
  Robert Franks
  Harry Froling
  Adam Gibson
  Josh Giddey
 / Al Green
  Dusty Hannahs
  Hyrum Harris
 / Julius Hodge
  Matt Hodgson
  Jacob Holmes
  Nick Horvath
  Isaac Humphries
  Daniel Johnson
  Brett Maher
  Nick Marshall
  Mitch McCarron
  Mike McKay
 / Darnell Mee
  Ramone Moore
  Brock Motum
  Mark Nash
  Scott Ninnis
  Brandon Paul
  Darryl Pearce
  Anthony Petrie
 / Jerome Randle
  Paul Rees
  Paul Rogers
 / Robert Rose
 / Dusty Rychart
  Luke Schenscher
  Donald Sloan
  Phil Smyth
  Nathan Sobey
  Charles Thomas
  Brett Wheeler
 / Jacob Wiley
 / Jamar Wilson
  Pāora Winitana

All-time team 
In November 2015, Adelaide's daily newspaper The Advertiser ran an online poll to find the fans favourite / best ever team. The results were as follows:

 Coach – Phil Smyth

Championship Teams 
The Adelaide 36ers have hosted 8 NBL Grand Final games, 2 at the Apollo Stadium and 6 at the Clipsal Powerhouse (Titanium Security Arena). The 36ers have won 5 of those 8 games with their only home losses being Game 2 of the 1986 series against Brisbane, Game 1 of 1994 against North Melbourne, and Game 2 of 1998–99 against Victoria.

1986 NBL championship team 
The Adelaide 36ers won their first NBL championship in 1986. The team, known as the West End 36ers after sponsorship from the South Australian Brewing Company, had a 24–2 regular season record which included becoming the first team to go through the regular season unbeaten at home with a 13–0 record at the Apollo Stadium, earning them the nickname "Invincibles" given by leading basketball journalist Boti Nagy. The 36ers defeated the Illawarra Hawks in a one-sided Semi-final before gaining revenge for the 1985 Grand Final loss to the Brisbane Bullets by defeating them in the NBL's first ever three game Grand Final series 2–1.

In 2012 the NBL announced that the 1986 Adelaide 36ers were voted as the greatest single season team in league history.

Game 1 – 36ers 122 def. Bullets 119 (OT) @ Brisbane Entertainment Centre
Game 2 – Bullets 104 def. 36ers 83 @ Apollo Stadium
Game 3 – 36ers 113 def. Bullets 91 @ Apollo Stadium

 Head coach: Ken Cole
 Assistant coach: Don Shipway

1998 NBL championship team 
Adelaide def. South East Melbourne Magic 2–0.
Game 1 – 36ers 100 def. Magic 93 @ Clipsal Powerhouse
Game 2 – 36ers 90 def. Magic 62 @ National Tennis Centre

 Head coach: Phil Smyth
 Assistant coach: Steve Breheny

1998–99 NBL championship team 
Adelaide def. Victoria Titans 2–1.
Game 1 – 36ers 104 def. Titans 94 @ National Tennis Centre
Game 2 – Titans 88 def. 36ers 82 @ Clipsal Powerhouse
Game 3 – 36ers 80 def. Titans 69 @ Clipsal Powerhouse

 Head coach: Phil Smyth
 Assistant coach: Steve Breheny
 Assistant coach: Scott Ninnis

2001–02 NBL championship team 
In Game 3 of the 2001–02 NBL Grand Final series at the Clipsal Powerhouse, the 36ers broke their own NBL record for the most points scored in an NBL Grand Final game of 122 (set in Game 1 of 1986) when they scored 125 points to defeat the West Sydney Razorbacks by 18 points. This record still stands as of the 2016 NBL Grand Final.

Adelaide def. West Sydney Razorbacks 2–1.
Game 1 – 36ers 106 def. Razorbacks 97 @ Clipsal Powerhouse
Game 2 – Razorbacks 103 def. 36ers 100 @ State Sports Centre
Game 3 – 36ers 125 def. Razorbacks 107 @ Clipsal Powerhouse

 Head coach: Phil Smyth
 Assistant coach: Steve Breheny
 Assistant coach: Scott Ninnis

Preseason games against NBA teams 
The 36ers have played several preseason games in the United States against National Basketball Association (NBA) teams. The first game against an NBA team was played on 5 October 2018, when Adelaide lost to Utah Jazz.

On 2 October 2022, the 36ers became the first NBL team to beat an NBA team when they defeated the Phoenix Suns.

References

External links 

 

 
National Basketball League (Australia) teams
Basketball clubs in Adelaide
Basketball teams established in 1982
1982 establishments in Australia
Sporting clubs in Adelaide